Count Erik Jönsson Dahlbergh (10 October 162516 January 1703) was a Swedish military engineer, Governor-general and Field marshal. He rose to the level of nobility through his military competence. As  an architect and draftsman, he was renowned for fortification works. He is most known for his collection of engravings Suecia Antiqua et Hodierna, a collection of engravings of topographical research.

Biography 

Erik Dahlbergh was born in Stockholm, Sweden. His early studies involved the science of fortification. Orphaned at an early age, Dahlbergh's studies qualified him as a scribe and in 1641 he found employment in Hamburg with  Gerdt Rehnskiöld (1610−1658),  senior accountant for Pommern and Mecklenburg. Over a six year period, he was taught the fundamentals in draughtsmanship.  While learning these skills, he also  studied mathematics, architecture, perspective and map drawing.

He saw service as an engineer officer during the latter years of the Thirty Years' War. In 1650, the military command dispatched Dahlbergh to Frankfurt to recoup war indemnity awarded to Sweden following the Treaty of Westphalia. Dahlbergh also contacted the publishing firm of Merian and provided topographical maps.

While studying art in Italy, news reached him of a coming war between Sweden and Poland-Lithuania and he saw the potential for a military career.   In his military career, Dahlbergh saw service in Poland as adjutant-general and engineering adviser to Charles X of Sweden. He  participated in March across the Belts  and at the sieges of Copenhagen and Kronborg where he directed the engineers during the Northern Wars.

In spite of his distinguished service, Dahlbergh remained a  lieutenant-colonel for many years.
His talents were later recognized and in 1676, he became director-general of fortifications for the Swedish crown. As director, Dahlbergh rendered distinguished service over the next twenty-five years.

At Helsingborg in 1677, he was a key operative in the Great Northern War at Dunamünde, and in 1700 he was instrumental in the defense of the two sieges of Riga.  His work in repairing the fortresses of his own country earned for him the title of the "Vauban of Sweden". He was also the founder of the Swedish engineer corps. He retired while in the rank of field marshal in 1702 and died the following year.

Legacy 
In modern times, Erik Dahlbergh best known for compiling the collection of engravings called "Suecia Antiqua et Hodierna"  published 1660–1716, and for assisting Samuel Pufendorf in his "Histoire de Charles X Gustave". He also wrote a memoir of his life ( Svenska Bibliotek, 1757) and an account "Of the campaigns of Charles X" (ed. Lundblad, Stockholm, 1823).

Appointments 

 Governor of Jönköping County (1687–1693)
 Governor-General of Bremen-Verden (1693)
 Field Marshal (1693)
 Governor-General of Livonia (1696–1702)

See also 
 Fortifications of Gothenburg
 Sébastien Le Prestre de Vauban
 Menno van Coehoorn
 Tureholm Castle

References

Other sources
 Leif Jonsson (1992) Stormaktstid : Erik Dahlbergh och bilden av Sverige 	(Lidköping: Stiftelsen Läckö Institutet)

External links 
Suecia Antiqua et Hodierna  Royal Library of Sweden

1625 births
1703 deaths
Military personnel from Stockholm
Swedish military engineers
Swedish cartographers
County governors of Sweden
Field marshals of Sweden
Governors-General of Sweden
Swedish counts
17th-century cartographers
17th-century soldiers
Swedish military personnel of the Great Northern War
17th-century Swedish military personnel
Caroleans